Wang Zixuan (born 12 November 1992) is a Chinese actress known for her role as Gu Ying in the web drama Tientsin Mystic (2017).

Early life 
Wang Zixuan was born in Xichang, Sichuan Province, China. She began to study ballet since childhood. She entered the Central Academy of Drama in 2010, majoring in performing arts.

Career 
In 2015, Wang debuted in the TV series Men., playing a girl who ran an online shop. In the same year, she starred alongside Zhou Dongyu and Sun Honglei in the comedy film The Ark of Mr. Chow, portraying a "campus goddess".

In 2016, Wang starred in the historical romance drama  Princess Jieyou. Then she starred alongside Chen Kun and Bai Baihe in the comedy film Chongqing Hot Pot.
She also played a female college student in the youth drama So Young, based on the novel of the same name by Xin Yiwu. In the same year, Wang starred alongside Jiang Jinfu and Yuan Bingyan in the costume drama Royal Highness.

In 2017, Wang starred as the lead female role, "Little Godly Woman (小神婆)" in the fantasy suspense web drama Tientsin Mystic, an adaptation of novel He Shen written by Tianxia Bachang. The series was a hit and contributed to her rise in popularity.

In 2018, Wang was cast in the fantasy adventure drama The Golden Eyes as the female lead. The same year, she was cast as one of the lead roles in the period drama The Eight. Wang is set to reprise her role in the second season of Tientsin Mystic.

Filmography

Film

Television series

Discography

Awards

References

External links 
 Wang Zixuan on Sina Weibo (in Chinese)

1992 births
Living people
Actresses from Sichuan
People from Xichang
Central Academy of Drama alumni
21st-century Chinese actresses
Chinese television actresses